The Liberia National Union (LINU) is a political party in Liberia West Africa.  It was formed by Dr. Harry Moniba, the former Vice President of Liberia (1984 - 1990).  Moniba also helped to create the multi party election system that the country currently uses.  He served as LINU's first standard bearer as well. It participated in the 11 October 2005 elections as part of the three-party United Democratic Alliance (UDA) coalition.

Dr. Clarence K. Moniba, the leader of the Liberian National Union (LINU), announced on Thursday, January 19, 2023 at 5 AM his intention to run for the 2023 presidency.

Political parties in Liberia